Like a River to the Sea may refer to:

 "Like a River to the Sea", a 1993 song by the American country musician Steve Wariner
 Like a River to the Sea, a 2015 album by the British musician Jahnavi Harrison